Superior Drummer 2.0 is a sample based drum software synthesizer developed by Toontrack, similar to previous software such as Drumkit from Hell, but with a complete overhaul of the original Drumkit from Hell Superior engine. The software has been re-developed for optimised use with electronic drum kits with more effective use of sample layers and much improved loading times. The software comes with multiple built in fx such as a 5 band EQ, High-pass and Low-pass filter, compressor, gate and a transient design filter.

Superior Drummer 2.0, “The New York Studio Legacy Series”, was recorded by Pat Thrall, Neil Dorfsman and Nir Z at The Hit Factory, Avatar Studios and Allaire studios, New York City.

Samples of a variety of drum parts (for example, snare, toms, bass drum, cymbals, cowbell etc.) were recorded using various techniques (e.g. Sidestick on the snare, Rimshots etc.), using a wide range of microphones placed in different locations (close range to record a particular drum, or a condenser microphone placed at the back of the live room to capture the ambient, room sound of the kit), all finally worked into the software to allow users to manipulate the sound of their drum kit to the finest detail. Users can even modify the amount of bleed between microphones.

See also 
EZdrummer
Drumkit from Hell

External links 
 Superior Drummer 2.0 at the Toontrack website

Drum machines